Queen Seonui (14 December 1705 – 12 August 1730) of the Hamjong Eo clan, was the second wife of Yi Yun, King Gyeongjong, the 20th Joseon monarch. She was Queen of Joseon from 1720 until her husband's death in 1724, after which she was honoured as Royal Queen Dowager Gyeongsun (경순왕대비).

Biography
The future queen was born on 14 December 1705 during the reign of King Sukjong. Her father, Eo Yu-Gu, was a member of the Hamjong Eo clan, and her mother was a member of the Jeonju Yi clan.

Her 4th cousin eventually married Lady Hyegyeong’s father's cousin, Hong Sang-han. They would eventually become the great-grandparents of Hong Hyeon-ju; the husband of Princess Sukseon, a daughter of King Jeongjo and Royal Noble Consort Su of the Bannam Park clan.

In 1718, when Lady Eo was 14 years old, she married the 30 year old Crown Prince Hwiso and was appointed as crown princess consort. When her husband ascended to the throne and became the 20th Joseon monarch (temple name: Gyeongjong) in 1720, she automatically became queen consort.

The King suffered ill health and was unable to produce an heir—or to do much of anything for that matter. During his reign, the Noron and Soron factions battled for power. The Soron faction were the ruling political faction and supported Gyeongjong, and the Noron faction supported his half-brother, Prince Yeoning. The Noron faction and his step-mother, Queen Dowager Hyesun pressured him to appoint Prince Yeoning as his heir.

According to one theory, the Queen opposed Prince Yeoning and planned to secretly adopt Prince Milpung (밀풍군, Milpung-Gun), the great-grandson of Crown Prince Sohyeon, King Injo's first son. However, two months after the King's enthronement, Prince Yeoning was installed as Crown Prince (Wangseje, 왕세제, 王世弟).

Gyeongjong later died in 1724 and the Queen was honoured as Queen Dowager Gyeongsun. Prince Yeoning succeeded his brother as the 21st Joseon monarch (temple name: Yeongjo). After she knowing that her family were suspected of an assassination attempt on Yeongjo, Gyeongsun was enraged and rejected all the food. She died of starvation in 1730 in Jeoseung Hall of Gyeonghui Palace.

She was posthumously given the title of Queen Seonui (선의왕후, 宣懿王后).

After her death, Jeoseung Hall was accommodated and converted into living quarters for Crown Prince Sado to which the name was changed to Chwiseondang (취선당), and was also a Soju room. In her memoir, Lady Hyegyeong stated that the reason why Crown Prince Sado's mental state worsened or started was because of the ominous environment that the hall living quarters had; Royal Noble Consort Hui, Gyeongjong's mother, was executed in the hall in 1701, and Queen Seonui died 37 years later in the same hall.

Family

Parent
 Father − Eo Yu-Gu (18 April 1675 – 16 January 1740) (어유구, 魚有龜)
 1) Grandfather − Eo Sa-hyeong (어사형, 魚史衡) (1647 - 1723)
 2) Great-Grandfather − Eo Jin-ik (어진익, 魚震翼) (6 November 1625 - 25 August 1684)
 3) Great-Great-Grandfather − Eo Han-myeong (어한명, 魚漢明) (1592 - 1648)
 4) Great-Great-Great-Grandfather − Eo Mong-rin (어몽린, 魚夢獜)
 3) Great-Great-Grandmother − Lady Kwon of the Andong Kwon clan (안동 권씨, 安東權氏) (? - 1670)
 2) Great-Grandmother − Lady Won of the Wonju Won clan (원주 원씨, 原州元氏) (1625 - 15 July 1715)
 1) Grandmother − Lady Yun of the Jeonju Yun clan (정경부인 전주 유씨, 貞敬夫人 全州 柳氏) (1645 - ?)
 Mother
 Stepmother - Internal Princess Consort Jeonseong of the Jeonui Lee clan (증 전성부부인 전의 이씨, 贈 全城府夫人 全義 李氏) (1673 - 1692)
 Step grandfather - Lee Man-mo (통덕랑 이만모, 通德郞 李萬模)
 Biological mother - Internal Princess Consort Wanreung of the Jeonju Yi clan (완릉부부인 전주 이씨, 贈 完陵府夫人 全州 李氏); Eo Yu-gu's second wife
 1) Grandfather − Yi Ha-beon (현감 이하번, 縣監 李夏蕃)
 1) Grandmother − Lady Kim (김씨, 金氏)
 Stepmother - Internal Princess Consort Sangsan of the Sangsan Kim clan (상산부부인 김씨, 商山府夫人 金氏) (? - 1754)
 Step grandfather - Kim Dong-seol (김동설, 學生 金東說)

Sibling

 Older half-sister - Lady Eo of the Hamjong Eo clan (어씨)
 Brother-in-law - Kim Si-gyo (김시교, 知事 金時敎) of the Andong Kim clan (안동 김씨,  安東 金氏)
Older sister − Lady Eo of the Hamjong Eo clan (어씨)
 Brother-in-law − Yi Bo-sang (이보상, 李普祥) of the Jeonju Yi clan
 Older sister − Lady Eo of the Hamjong Eo clan (어씨)
 Brother-in-law − Hong Gye-gu (홍계구, 洪啓九)
 Younger half-sister − Lady Eo of the Hamjong Eo clan (어씨)
 Brother-in-law - Yi Ji-sun (이지순, 李址順) of the Hansan Yi clan (한산 이씨, 韓山 李氏) 
 Younger half-sister − Lady Eo of the Hamjong Eo clan (어씨)
 Brother-in-law − Sim Yi-ji of the Cheongseong Sim clan (청송 심씨) (심이지, 沈履之) (1720 - 1780)
 Younger half-brother - Eo Seok-jeong (어석정, 魚錫定) (1731 - 1793)
 Sister-in-law - Lady Sim of the Cheongsong Sim clan (청송 심씨, 靑松 沈氏)
 Younger half-brother - Eo Seok-nyeong (어석녕, 魚錫寧)
 Sister-in-law - Lady Hong of the Namyang Hong clan (남양 홍씨, 南陽 洪氏)

Consort

 Husband − Yi Yun, King Gyeongjong (20 November 1688 – 11 October 1724) (조선 경종) — No issue.
 Father-in-law − Yi Sun, King Sukjong (숙종대왕) (1661 - 1720)
 Mother-in-law − Jang Ok-jeong, Royal Noble Consort Hui of the Indong Jang clan (희빈 장씨)

Notes

External links
 https://thetalkingcupboard.com/joseon/royal-ladies-of-joseon-dynasty/

1705 births
1730 deaths
Royal consorts of the Joseon dynasty
Korean queens consort
Hamjong Eo clan
18th-century Korean women